Kopsia dasyrachis is a tree in the family Apocynaceae.

Description
The bark is grey or yellow. Its flowers feature a white corolla.

Distribution and habitat
Kopsia dasyrachis is endemic to Borneo, where it is known only from Sabah. Its habitat is lowland forests from sea level to  altitude.

References

dasyrachis
Endemic flora of Borneo
Plants described in 1934